Radical 69 or radical axe meaning "axe" is one of the 34 Kangxi radicals (214 radicals in total) composed of 4 strokes.

In the Kangxi Dictionary, there are 55 characters (out of 49,030) to be found under this radical.

 is also the 85th indexing component in the Table of Indexing Chinese Character Components predominantly adopted by Simplified Chinese dictionaries published in mainland China.

It is also the symbol of the catty, a traditional Chinese unit of mass used across East and Southeast Asia, notably for weighing food and other groceries in some wet markets, street markets, and shops.

Evolution

Derived characters

Literature

External links

Unihan Database - U+65A4

069
085